The 1968–69 season was the 67th in the history of the Western Football League.

The champions for the first time in their history were Taunton Town.

League table
The league was reduced from 21 to 19 clubs after Salisbury joined the Southern League and Plymouth Argyle Colts left. No new clubs joined.

References

1968-69
5